Diocese of San Francisco may refer to:

 Roman Catholic Archdiocese of San Francisco, U.S.
 Roman Catholic Diocese of San Francisco, Argentina
 Roman Catholic Diocese of San Francisco de Macorís, Dominican Republic